Fenwick is a surname. Notable people with the surname include:

Alf Fenwick (1891–1975), English footballer
Alistair Fenwick (born 1951), retired British auto racing driver
Benedict Joseph Fenwick (1782–1846), the second Roman Catholic Bishop of Boston
Bobby Fenwick (born 1946), retired Major League Baseball player
Charles Fenwick (1850–1918), British trade unionist and politician
Edward Fenwick (1768–1832), Bishop of Cincinnati, Ohio
Eliza Fenwick (1766–1840), English author
Ethel Gordon Fenwick (1857–1947), British nurse
Fairfax Fenwick (1852–1920), New Zealand cricketer
Sir George Fenwick (1847–1929), New Zealand newspaper proprietor and editor
Herbert Fenwick (1861–1934), New Zealand cricketer
Irene Fenwick (1887–1936), American stage and silent film actress
Isabella Fenwick (1783 – 1856), British amanuensis and writer of Fenwick Notes
Jean Fenwick (1907-1998), American actress born in Trinidad
Jim Fenwick (1934-2021), Australian photojournalist
Sir John Fenwick, 1st Baronet (c. 1570 – c. 1658), English landowner
Sir John Fenwick, 3rd Baronet (1645–1697), English conspirator
John Fenwick (Quaker) (1618–1683), founder of Salem, New Jersey
Sir Leonard Fenwick, chief executive in the National Health Service
Lila Fenwick (1932–2020), American lawyer, human rights advocate, and United Nations official
Mark Fenwick (born 1948), British businessman, chairman of Fenwick (department store) chain 
Millicent Fenwick (1910–1992), American politician and diplomat
Paul Fenwick (born 1969), retired Canadian international association football player
Perry Fenwick (born 1962), British actor
Peter Fenwick (politician) (born 1944), Canadian politician
Peter Fenwick (neuropsychologist), neuropsychiatrist and neurophysiologist
 Ralph Fenwick, shipping insurer and director of the New Zealand Company in 1825
Ray Fenwick, guitarist and session musician
Scott Fenwick (born 1990), English professional footballer
Steve Fenwick (born 1951), former Wales international rugby union and league player
Terry Fenwick (born 1959), former England international footballer

Fictional characters:
Chris Fenwick, fictional character on the British television soap opera Hollyoaks
Doreen Fenwick, fictional character on the British soap opera Coronation Street
Sir George and Maude Fenwick, characters in The Woman in Green
Martin Fenwick, villain in the cartoon Sherlock Holmes in the 22nd Century
Inspector Fenwick of the Royal Canadian Mounted Police and his daughter Nell Fenwick, associates of the cartoon character Dudley Do-Right
Vernon Fenwick, Teenage Mutant Ninja Turtles